Vinyl Cafe Odd Jobs (2001) is a two-CD album by Stuart McLean released by Vinyl Cafe Productions.

This collection of stories was taken from CBC Radio concerts that were recorded in Burgessville, Lindsay, Markham, and Toronto in Ontario; in Sherwood Park, Alberta; and in Vancouver, British Columbia.

It was recorded in concert for the CBC Radio show The Vinyl Cafe.

Track listing

 "Toilet Training The Cat" - 20:54
 "Music Lessons" - 16:04
 "Arthur the Dog" - 14:34
 "Love Never Ends" - 22:30
 "Odd Jobs" - 18:20
 "The Fig Tree" - 17:35
 "No Tax on Truffles" - 22:08
 "The Bare Truth" - 16:25

See also
Stuart McLean
The Vinyl Cafe
List of Dave and Morley stories

References

External links
 Vinyl Cafe with Stuart McLean - The Official Website

Stuart McLean albums
2001 live albums